Rosalie Sully (June 3, 1818 – July 8, 1847) was a nineteenth century American painter who had a lesbian relationship with Charlotte Cushman.

Early life 
Rosalie Sully was born on June 3, 1818. She was the daughter of painter, Thomas Sully, and Sarah Annis Sully. She had three sisters: Jane Cooper Sully Darley, Blanche Sully, and Ellen Oldmixon Sully Wheeler as well as one brother, Alfred Sully. She also had two half-siblings, Mary Chester Sully Neagle and Thomas Wilcocks Sully, from her mother's previous marriage to her father's elder brother, Lawrence Sully.

Career 
Rosalie Sully was a painter. She exhibited landscapes in New York in 1839, and painted several miniatures for actress Charlotte Cushman. Her work was created in a small studio adjoining her father's larger studio. However, due to Rosalie's premature death her promising career never fully blossomed.

Personal life 
Rosalie Sully met Charlotte Cushman in the summer of 1843, while Cushman was getting her portrait painted by Rosalie's father. After their meeting, Cushman and Rosalie became romantically involved and exchanged many passionate letters. On June 1, 1844, Cushman sent Rosalie a ring for her birthday, a precursor of events to come. On July 5, 1844, Cushman wrote in her diary that she had "Slept with Rose" and, on July 6, 1844, Cushman wrote that they were "married". However, their time together as a "married" couple was short-lived. Cushman left in November 1844 on an English tour, which put a strain on the couple's relationship but did not end it, until Rosalie found out that Cushman had started seeing someone else overseas. Upon receipt of this news, Rosalie sank into a severe depression which she remained in until death.

Death 
Rosalie Sully died from fever on July 8, 1847 in Philadelphia, Pennsylvania. She is buried at the Laurel Hill Cemetery in Philadelphia along with her father, mother and all but one of her siblings.

References 

19th-century American painters
American lesbian artists
American women painters
1818 births
1847 deaths
19th-century American women artists